(Dearest Jesus, my desire), is a church cantata by Johann Sebastian Bach. He composed the dialogue cantata in Leipzig for the first Sunday after Epiphany and first performed it on 13 January 1726 as part of his third cantata cycle.

Bach composed the cantata in his third year as Thomaskantor on a text which Georg Christian Lehms, a court poet in Darmstadt, had published already in 1711. Lehms derived from the prescribed gospel, the finding in the Temple, a dialogue. Instead of a parent missing a son, as in the gospel, an allegorical Soul (soprano) misses Jesus (bass). The motifs of the story, the loss and anxious search, are placed in a more general situation in which the listener can identify with the Soul. As Lehms did not provide a closing chorale, Bach chose the twelfth and final stanza of Paul Gerhardt's hymn "".

Bach structured the cantata in six movements, first alternating arias and recitative, then uniting the voices in recitative and aria, finally a chorale. The two soloists are supported by an intimate Baroque instrumental ensemble of oboe, strings and continuo. The oboe accompanies the soprano, a solo violin the bass, both play when the voices are united.

History and words 
Bach composed the cantata in his third year as Thomaskantor (director of church music) in Leipzig for the First Sunday after Epiphany. The prescribed readings for the Sunday were taken from the Epistle to the Romans, speaking of the duties of a Christian, and from the Gospel of Luke, the finding in the Temple. Bach composed a text written by Georg Christian Lehms, court poet in Darmstadt, who published it in 1711. Bach had set texts by Lehms already when he composed cantatas for the Weimar court from 1714 to 1717. He had set a similar work by Lehms a few weeks earlier,  for the second day of Christmas.

Lehms treated the Gospel to an allegorical dialogue of Jesus and the Soul. Lehms imagines not a parent searching for a missing son, but more generally the Christian Soul "with whom we are expected to identify", as John Eliot Gardiner notes. The Bach scholar Klaus Hofmann comments that the poet "takes up the general motifs of the story: the loss, the search for Jesus and his rediscovery, and places them in the context of the believer’s relationship with Jesus". The dialogue also refers to medieval mysticism and to imagery of the Song of Songs. Lehms did not provide a closing chorale; Bach added the twelfth and final stanza of Paul Gerhardt's hymn "" (1647). It is sung to the melody of "", which was codified by Louis Bourgeois when setting the Geneva Psalm 42 in his collection of Pseaumes octante trios de David (Geneva, 1551). Bourgeois seems to have been influenced by the secular song Ne l'oseray je dire contained in the Manuscrit de Bayeux published around 1510.

Bach led the first performance of the cantata on 13 January 1726 as part of his third cantata cycle.

Music

Structure and scoring 
Bach structured the cantata in six movements, four movements of alternating arias and recitatives, then the voices united in a duet and finally a closing chorale. He scored the intimate dialogue for soprano and bass soloist, a four-part choir only in the chorale, and a Baroque instrumental ensemble of oboe (Ob), two violins (Vl), viola (Va) and basso continuo. The duration is given as 22 minutes.

In the following table of the movements, the scoring follows the Neue Bach-Ausgabe. The keys and time signatures are taken from the book on all cantatas by the Bach scholar Alfred Dürr, using the symbols for common time (4/4) and alla breve (2/2). The continuo, playing throughout, is not shown.

Movements 
The dialogue, set in arias and recitatives for a solo voice and in duets, shows that Bach was familiar with Italian contemporary opera.

1 
The dialogue is opened by the soprano as the Soul in an aria in E minor, marked lento, "" (Dearest Jesus, my desire), The voice is complemented by an obbligato oboe, described by John Eliot Gardiner as "a solo oboe as her accomplice in spinning the most ravishing cantilena in the manner of one of Bach’s concerto slow movements". Julian Mincham distinguishes in the oboe line two different "ideas", in the first five measures a "sense of striving, effort and stretching upwards", then "garlands" of content in achieving a union, as the last lines of the text say "" (Ah! My treasure, bring me joy, let me embrace You with greatest delight).

2 
The bass answers in a short recitative, "" (How is it, that you sought Me?), a paraphrase of Jesus saying in the gospel that he has to be in his Father's place.

3 
He expands the reasoning in a da capo aria in B minor, "" (Here, in My Father's place). embellished by a solo violin, which "encircles the voice with triplets and trills". The words " (troubled spirit) appear whenever mentioned in "minor-mode colourings in the melody and harmony".

4 
In the following dialogue recitative, "" (Ah! Bach sets the text as an "evocative arioso with a pulsating string accompaniment". The two voices never sing at the same time.

5 
A duet, "" (Now all trouble disappears), finally unites both voices and also their "associated obbligato instruments (oboe and violin), so far heard only separately". Gardiner writes: "It is one of those duets … in which he seems to throw caution to the winds, rivalling the lieto fine conclusions to the operas of his day, but with far more skill, substance and even panache".

6 
A four-part setting of Paul Gerhardt's hymn, "" (My God, open the gates), "returns the cantata – also in terms of style – to the sphere of reverence appropriate for a church service".

Recordings 
The entries are taken from the listing on the Bach Cantatas Website. Instrumental groups playing period instruments in historically informed performances are marked green under the header .

Notes

References

External links 
 Liebster Jesu, mein Verlangen, BWV 32: performance by the Netherlands Bach Society (video and background information)
 
 Liebster Jesu, mein Verlangen (Concerto in dialogo) BWV 32; BC A 31 / Sacred cantata (1st Sunday of Epiphany) Bach Digital
 BWV 32.6 bach-chorales.com

Church cantatas by Johann Sebastian Bach
1726 compositions
Psalm-related compositions by Johann Sebastian Bach